The 2022 Oklahoma Sooners softball team was an American college softball team that represented the University of Oklahoma during the 2022 NCAA Division I softball season. The Sooners were led by Patty Gasso in her twenty-eighth season, and played their home games at OU Softball Complex. They competed in the Big 12 Conference, where they finished the season with a 59–3 record, including 17–1 in conference play.

Previous season
The Sooners finished the 2021 season 56–4 overall, and 16–1 in the Big 12, finishing in first place in their conference. Following the conclusion of the regular season, the Sooners received an automatic bid to the 2021 NCAA Division I softball tournament after winning the Big 12 Tournament. During the NCAA tournament they defeated Morgan State in the regional finals and Washington in the super regionals. They won the 2021 Women's College World Series over Florida State.

Preseason
Oklahoma was ranked No. 1 in the nation in the preseason polls by NFCA/USA Today, ESPN.com/USA Softball, D1Softball and Softball America.

Award watch lists

Roster

Schedule

Rankings

References

Oklahoma
Oklahoma Softball
Oklahoma
NCAA Division I softball tournament seasons
Oklahoma Sooners softball seasons
Women's College World Series seasons